Loshan may refer to:
 Lowshan, Iran
 Luoshan County, China
 Leshan, China